Mark Tremell McLemore (born October 4, 1964) is an American former professional baseball second baseman and utility player in Major League Baseball (MLB).

Early years
McLemore grew up in Southeast San Diego, where he went to Samuel F. B. Morse High School with Sam Horn. They were coached by Bob Mendoza, a San Diego Hall of Champions Coaching Legend inductee.

McLemore was recruited heavily to play college football as a wide receiver and defensive back but opted to play professional baseball when selected in the 1982 Major League Baseball draft because baseball was his "passion."

Playing career 
McLemore played for the California Angels –, Cleveland Indians 1990, Houston Astros , Baltimore Orioles –, Texas Rangers –, Seattle Mariners –, and Oakland Athletics .

Mark McLemore's primary claim to fame is his nickname "Supersub", which he earned due to his contributions to the –03 Seattle Mariners. He was the club's regular second baseman during the 2000 season, and in 2001 he was replaced by Bret Boone, who had been acquired during the offseason. With McLemore openly bitter about losing his job, manager Lou Piniella appeased him by using him regularly in a variety of infielder and outfielder positions (mainly LF, 3B and SS, but also 2B, CF, DH and RF), with remarkable results. During the 2001 Mariners' record-tying 116-win season, he racked up 409 at-bats, 117 hits, 69 walks, .286 batting average, .384 OBP and 39 stolen bases—all while playing without a regular position.

McLemore's statistics dropped steadily from his 2001 peak until he left the Mariners after 2003 as a free agent. He retired after one season with Oakland (2004). By having played with Oakland in his final year, he became the first major leaguer to have played for all four teams in the American League West since MLB divisions were realigned in 1994 (Gene Nelson also played for all four AL West teams, but his career ended in 1993, prior to the realignment). He is also one of a handful of players to play for both the Rangers and the Astros, Texas' two MLB franchises.

Post-playing career 
McLemore had a brief stint as a color commentator for baseball games on ESPN. He currently serves as part of the Texas Rangers broadcast team, for whom he provides analysis on the pre- and post-game programs on Bally Sports Southwest. Previously, he also did analysis on the Friday night Texas Ranger broadcasts on TXA21 (KTXA) with Gina Miller before those broadcasts ended after the 2014 season.

References

External links

1964 births
Living people
African-American baseball players
American expatriate baseball players in Canada
Baltimore Orioles players
Baseball players from San Diego
California Angels players
Charlotte Rangers players
Cleveland Indians players
Colorado Springs Sky Sox players
Edmonton Trappers players
Houston Astros players
Jackson Generals (Texas League) players
Major League Baseball second basemen
Midland Angels players
Oakland Athletics players
Oklahoma City 89ers players
Palm Springs Angels players
Peoria Suns players
Redwood Pioneers players
Rochester Red Wings players
Sacramento River Cats players
Salem Angels players
Seattle Mariners players
Texas Rangers (baseball) announcers
Texas Rangers players
Tucson Toros players
21st-century African-American people
20th-century African-American sportspeople